Stand Up is the fifth album by British pop group Right Said Fred. It debuted in the Top Ten of the German Albums Chart, following the success of their previous album Fredhead in the country. The album's lone single "Stand Up (For the Champions)" went on to become a heavily used track at sports events all over the world. The song also reached #1 in Japan.

Track listing
"Stand Up (For the Champions)"
"Bombay Moon"
"I Love You But I Don't Like You"
"Something in Your Eyes"
"Jesus Is a Clubber"
"Summertime Fools"
"Popsong"
"Under a Simpsons' Sky"
"Fräulein Wunderbar"
"Jubilee"
"Night Night"

2002 albums
Right Said Fred albums